Baahubali (The One With Strong Arms) is the soundtrack of the 2015 Indian multilingual film of the same name.

Production
Rajamouli's cousin and his norm composer M. M. Keeravani composed the music for this film. After the break taken by the film's team after completion of war schedule on 5 March 2015, an official statement from the film's team stated that Keeravani is recording two songs from the film right now.
 Madhan Karky was selected as the lyricist for the Tamil version of the soundtrack. On 2 July 2014, the film's official website published that Keeravani is recording a song at Prasad Studios in Hyderabad which is sung by Deepu. On 28 October 2014, Keeravani told Deccan Chronicle that the writers are working on the lyrics of the songs and he would start working on them in a week's time. During the film's shoot in Bulgaria, the film's soundtrack was expected to be unveiled in February 2015. Lahari Music acquired the audio rights in early May 2015 for an amount of 30 million and the audio is accessible from YouTube. The team of Baahubali announced that the audio launch of the movie will take place in Sri Venkateswara University grounds, Tirupati on the official page of the movie on Twitter. The album also released in Hindi and Malayalam languages.

The film has eight tracks composed by M. M. Keeravani. The music was launched on 31 May 2015. Lyrics for the three songs were penned by Inaganti Sundar and Ananta Sriram, Ramajogayya Sastry, K Shiva Shakti Datta and Chaitanya Prasad were written one each while Aditya and Noel Sean wrote the lyrics for the last song. The music rights for the Tamil, Telugu and Malayalam versions of the soundtrack were acquired by Lahari Music and Manorama Music while Zee Music Company bought the audio rights of the Hindi version of soundtrack.

Track-Lists

Critical reception
123telugu.com gave a positive review saying, "All the songs are situational and will impress you even more after you watch S S Rajamouli’s stunning visuals on screen". Indiaglitz rated the album 3.25 out of 5 stating, "A variety of genres keep you engaged.  Keeravani marshalls his traditionalism as well as his knack for the zeitgeist in bringing out the most unlikely chorusus, among others". Baahubali songs album rated positively by Filmievents.com visitors by giving 4 out of 5 rating.  . Times of India rated the album 4 out of 5 stating, "The album relies heavily on classical instrumentation and is highly impressive".

See also 
Baahubali: The Beginning
Baahubali: Music from the Motion Picture
Baahubali (franchise)

References

2015 soundtrack albums
Telugu film soundtracks
M. M. Keeravani soundtracks
Baahubali (franchise)
Hindi film soundtracks